Ringford is a village in the historical county of Kirkcudbrightshire in Dumfries and Galloway  located at  beside the Tarff Water. It has a war memorial and a village hall. The Kirkcudbright Railway used to run past the village, the nearest stop being Tarff.

Villages in Dumfries and Galloway